Robert Mayes may refer to:

Bobby Mayes (born 1967), English professional footballer
Robert Burns Mayes (1867–1921), chief justice of Supreme Court of Mississippi